"No Sleep" is a song by American rapper Wiz Khalifa, released as the fourth official single from his debut major-label studio album, Rolling Papers. The track features production from Benny Blanco and Big Jerm, and was written by Cameron Thomaz and Benjamin Levin. The song was released as a single on August 9, 2011. The song debuted, and peaked at number six on the Billboard Hot 100, becoming Wiz Khalifa's third-highest charting song as a solo artist behind "Black and Yellow" and "See You Again". It is about the rapper's all night party.

Track listing
Digital download
"No Sleep" – 3:11

Music video
A music video for "No Sleep" was released on August 12, 2011. The video was directed by Colin Tilley and features cameo appearances by fellow Pittsburgh-rapper Mac Miller, Wiz Khalifa's Taylor Gang mate Chevy Woods, and his ex-girlfriend, video model Amber Rose.

Charts
"No Sleep" debuted at number six on April 9, 2011 on the Billboard Hot 100. It re-entered the Hot 100 on August 27, 2011 at number 98 following the music video's and the single's release, and since reached number 70.

Certifications

Release history

References

2011 singles
2011 songs
Wiz Khalifa songs
Song recordings produced by Benny Blanco
Songs written by Wiz Khalifa
Songs written by Benny Blanco
Music videos directed by Colin Tilley
Atlantic Records singles